Anders Agensø is a Danish actor, born 1961 in Denmark.

Films 
You Are Not Alone 1978

References

External links

1961 births
Living people
Danish male film actors
20th-century Danish male actors
Danish male child actors
Date of birth missing (living people)
Place of birth missing (living people)